I Remember (我記得) is the fifth studio album by Taiwanese rock singer Shin.

Track listing

References

2012 albums
Shin (singer) albums